Manchester Victoria Reversing Sidings is an electric traction depot located in Manchester, England.  The depot is situated on the Liverpool to Manchester Line and is located near Manchester Victoria station.

History 
Before its temporary closure in 1989, the depot was known as Manchester Victoria Red Bank and it was a stabling point for Class 104 and 107 DMUs. Newspaper vans also used to be stored here until their nightly duties.

Present 
As of 2020, the depot has no allocation. It is, instead, a stabling point for Northern Class 319 EMUs.

References 
 

Railway depots in England
Rail transport in Greater Manchester